Arphia is a genus of band-winged grasshoppers in the family Acrididae. There are at least 11 described species in Arphia.

Species
 Arphia behrensi Saussure, 1884 (California sulphur-winged grasshopper)
 Arphia conspersa Scudder, 1875 (speckle-winged rangeland grasshopper)
 Arphia granulata Saussure, 1884 (southern yellow-winged grasshopper)
 Arphia pecos Otte, 1984 (Pecos arphia)
 Arphia pseudonietana (Thomas, 1870) (red-winged grasshopper)
 Arphia pulchripennis Bruner, 1905
 Arphia ramona Rehn, 1902 (California orange-winged grasshopper)
 Arphia saussureana Bruner, 1889 (California red-winged grasshopper)
 Arphia simplex Scudder, 1875 (plains yellow-winged grasshopper)
 Arphia sulphurea (Fabricius, 1781) (sulphur-winged grasshopper)
 Arphia xanthoptera (Burmeister, 1838) (autumn yellow-winged grasshopper)

References

 Capinera J.L, Scott R.D., Walker T.J. (2004). Field Guide to Grasshoppers, Katydids, and Crickets of the United States. Cornell University Press.
 Otte, Daniel (1995). "Grasshoppers [Acridomorpha] D". Orthoptera Species File 5, 630.

Further reading

External links
 NCBI Taxonomy Browser, Arphia

Oedipodinae